Antony Beaujon also Anthony ( 1763 – 17 October 1805) was a Dutch and British civil servant and politician in Guyana. He served as Governor of Demarara from May 1795 until 5 July 1802, and as Lieutenant governor of Demerara and Essequibo from 13 August 1804 until his death.

Biography
Beaujon was born in Sint Eustatius in a family of merchants. In the 1790s, he was member of the Court of Policy of the Dutch colonies Demerara and Essequibo, and served as Secretary of Demarara. On 18 January 1795, William V, Prince of Orange fled from the Netherlands, and went into exile in Great-Britain. While in exile, Willem V started writing the Kew Letters to the colonial governors urging them to submit to Great-Britain. On 23 April 1795, Governor baron Willem August Sirtema van Grovestins discussed the matter with the Court of Policy, however the Patriots (Republicans) outnumbered the Orangists (traditionalists and nobility), and the colonies remained part of the Batavian Republic.

On 4 May 1795, HMS Zebra arrived in the harbour of Stabroek (nowadays: Georgetown) offering British protection against a possible French attack. The Court of Policy issued a statement that they could not accept the offer. Governor Sirtema van Grovestins boarded HMS Zebra which sailed away on 6 May, and Beaujon was appointed acting Governor of Demarara. On 20 April 1796, a British fleet appeared, and on 22 April, Demerara and Essequibo surrendered to Admiral Rodney without a fight. All laws and customs of the colonies could remain, and the citizens were equal to British subjects. Any government official who swore loyalty to the British crown could remain in function. Beaujon swore an oath of allegiance, and remained in function.

Demerara fared well under British rule, exports increased substantially and the number of slaves more than doubled. The colonies were returned to the Netherlands by the Peace of Amiens. On 5 July 1802, Beaujon was dismissed, and ordered to return to the Netherlands. Fearing a hostile reception, he decided to go to England instead.

On 18 May 1803, war was declared between Great Britain and France, and on 17 September, a British fleet arrived in Demerara which capitulated the next day. Lieutenant Colonel Robert Nicholson became acting Governor. On 13 August 1804, Beaujon had returned from England, and was installed as Lieutenant governor of Demerara and Essequibo.

On 17 October 1805, Beaujon died in Stabroek, at the age of 42.

Notes

References

Bibliography

1760s births
1805 deaths
Governors of Demerara
Governors of Essequibo
Guyanese politicians
Sint Eustatius people